Francesco Sbarra (19 February 1611 – 20 March 1668) was an Italian poet and librettist. Born in Lucca, he spent most of his career in Austria where he wrote the librettos for entertainments and operas at the courts of Archduke Ferdinand Charles in Innsbruck and Emperor Leopold I in Vienna.

Librettos
Alessandro vincitor di se stesso (opera in a prologue and 3 acts), set by Antonio Cesti, Venice 1651
Venere cacciatrice, set by Antonio Cesti, Innsbruck 1659
La magnanimità d'Alessandro, set by Antonio Cesti, Innsbruck, 1662
 Nettuno e Flora festeggianti (azione teatrale), set by Antonio Cesti, Vienna, 1666
Le Lachrime di San Pietro (azione sacra), set by Giovanni Felice Sances. Vienna. 1666
Le disgrazie d'Amore, set by Antonio Cesti, Vienna, 1667
La Germania esultante , set by Antonio Cesti, Vienna, 1667
Il pomo d'oro (opera in a prologue and 5 acts), set by Antonio Cesti, Vienna, 1668

References

External links
Complete librettos and other works by Sbarra on archive.org

1611 births
1668 deaths
Italian opera librettists
17th-century Italian poets
17th-century Italian male writers
Writers from Lucca